Harris platelet syndrome (HPS) is the most common inherited giant platelet disorder.

Presentation
HPS was identified among healthy blood donors in the north-eastern part of the Indian subcontinent, characterized by absent bleeding symptoms, mild to severe thrombocytopenia (platelets rarely < 50 × 109/L) with giant platelets (Mean platelet volume 10fL) and normal platelet aggregation studies with absent MYH9 mutation.

In the blood donors with HPS authors found a statistically higher MPV, RDW and a lower platelet count and platelet biomass.

Diagnosis
At present the diagnosis of HPS is made by ascertaining the ethnicity of the patient, as well as assessing for conditions causing acquired thrombocytopenias, and after also excluding the known inherited giant platelet disorders(IGPD) and other congenital thrombocytopenias. Unfortunately some patients with IGPD are treated inappropriately with corticosteroids, immunoglobulin infusions and even splenectomy.

Treatment

Prevalence
It is extremely important to recognize Harris platelet syndrome, as one third the population of certain parts of Indian subcontinent is affected.

Terminology
In 2002, this syndrome was called "asymptomatic constitutional macro thrombocytopenia" (ACMT).

In 2005, to avoid confusion between ACMT and congenital amegakaryocytic thrombocytopenia (CAMT) this CAMT entity was referred as Harris platelet syndrome.

References

Coagulopathies
Syndromes